Rani Mahal is an upcoming Indian television series, which will air on Sony Entertainment Television (India) and Sony Entertainment Television Asia. Many news sources claimed that this show is an Indian adaptation of American fantasy drama series Game of Thrones which based on best-selling novel A Song of Ice and Fire, which has been denied by Sony Entertainment Television (India) and Lost Boy Productions.

Cast 
Yuvraj Thakur
Anita Hassanandani
Ankita Lokhande
VJ Bani
Reena Roy as Raj Mata

References

External links
 Official website

2015 Indian television series debuts
Hindi-language television shows
Sony Entertainment Television original programming
Game of Thrones